This article lists various Swedish football records for the various Swedish football leagues and competitions and the Sweden national team.

National team

Men's national team 
Largest victory: 12–0
 vs. Latvia, 29 May 1927
Largest loss: 1–12
 vs. England Amateur, 20 October 1908
Most appearances, career: 148
 Anders Svensson (1999–2013)
Most appearances, consecutive: 45
 Orvar Bergmark (1956–62)
Most goals scored, career: 56
 Zlatan Ibrahimović (2001– )
Most penalty goals scored, career: 7
 Bo Larsson (1964–74)
Most hat-tricks, career: 9
 Taym Aljumailie (1924–32)
Fastest goal: 11 seconds
 Hjalmar Lorichs vs. Finland, 27 June 1912

Swedish Champions 
Most championships: 18
 IFK Göteborg
 1908, 1910, 1918, 1934–35, 1941–42, 1957–58, 1969, 1982, 1983, 1984, 1987, 1990, 1991, 1993, 1994, 1995, 1996, 2007
Most championships, consecutive: 4
 Örgryte IS
 1896, 1897, 1898, 1899
 1904, 1905, 1906, 1907
 IFK Norrköping
 1944–45, 1945–46, 1946–47, 1947–48
 IFK Göteborg
 1993, 1994, 1995, 1996

Allsvenskan 
Most championships: 20
 Malmö FF
 1943–44, 1948–49, 1949–50, 1950–51, 1952–53, 1965, 1967, 1970, 1971, 1974, 1975, 1977, 1985, 1986, 1987, 1988, 1989, 2004, 2010, 2013
Most championships, consecutive: 5
 Malmö FF
 1985, 1986, 1987, 1988, 1989
Most wins, season: 21
 Malmö FF (2010)
 Played 30, won 21, drew 4, lost 5
Fewest wins, season: 0
 Billingsfors IK
 Played 22, won 0, drew 3, lost 19
Wins, consecutive: 23
 Malmö FF (1949–50)
Without losses, consecutive: 49
 Malmö FF (1949–50)
 Played 49, won 41, drew 8
Losses, consecutive: 18
 GAIS (1959)
Without wins, consecutive: 22
 Billingsfors IK (1946–47)
 Played 22, drew 3, lost 19
Most points, season (2 points for a win): 43
 Malmö FF (1974)
 Played 26, won 19, drew 5, lost 2
Most points, season (3 points for a win): 67
 Malmö FF (2010)
 Played 30, won 21, drew 4, lost 5
Fewest points, season (2 points for a win): 3
 Billingsfors IK (1946–47)
 Played 22, won 0, drew 3, lost 19
Fewest points, season (3 points for a win): 10
 GIF Sundsvall (1991)
 Played 18, won 1, drew 7, lost 10
Most appearances, career: 431
 Sven Andersson (Örgryte IS, Helsingborgs IF) (1981–2001)
Most appearances, consecutive: 332
 Sven Jonasson (IF Elfsborg) (1927–42)
Most goals scored, career: 252
 Sven Jonasson (IF Elfsborg) (1927–42)
Most goals scored, season: 39
 Filip Johansson (IFK Göteborg) (1924–25)
Most goals scored, match: 7
 Arne Hjertsson (Malmö FF) vs. Halmstads BK, 3 June 1943 (12–0)
 Gunnar Nordahl (IFK Norrköping) vs. Landskrona BoIS 12 November 1944 (9–1)
Highest attendance, match:  52,194
 IFK Göteborg vs. Örgryte IS, 3 June 1959

Svenska Cupen 
Most championships: 14
 Malmö FF
 1944, 1946, 1947, 1951, 1953, 1967, 1972–73, 1973–74, 1974–75, 1977–78, 1979–80, 1983–84, 1985–86, 1988–89

Most successful clubs overall (1896 – present)

External links 
 Sveriges Fotbollshistoriker och Statistiker - statistics site
 Allsvenskan.just.nu  - statistics site

Records
Sweden
Rec